Magna American a division of Magna Corporation of Flowood, MS, was a manufacturer of tractors, lawn mowers, garden tillers, and specialized products including the Amphicat and the Magna Duck Plucker.  The company was based in Ohio, then moved to Raymond, Mississippi in the late 1960s.  The company ceased operations in the 1980s.

Agricultural machinery manufacturers of the United States